Danthai Boonma (born 23 January 1996) is a Thai professional golfer who plays on the Asian Tour.

Amateur career
As an amateur, Boonma won several tournaments in Asia. He also competed in several multi-sport events winning the following medals:

Professional career
Boonma turned professional in late 2014. He played on the Asian Tour in 2015, winning the World Classic Championship in November.

Amateur wins
2012 TGA-CAT Junior Ranking 4, TGA-CAT Junior Ranking 5, TGA-CAT Junior Championship (Asia Pacific), Asia Pacific Junior, Lion City Cup, Tehbotol Sosro International Junior
2013 TGA-CAT Junior Championship (Asia Pacific)
2014 MPI Saujana Amateur Championship, Singapore Open Amateur Championship, Putra Cup

Source:

Professional wins (6)

Asian Tour wins (2)

Japan Challenge Tour wins (1)

Asian Development Tour wins (1)

1Co-sanctioned by the All Thailand Golf Tour

All Thailand Golf Tour wins (3)

1Co-sanctioned by the Asian Development Tour

Results in major championships

CUT = missed the halfway cut

References

External links

Danthai Boonma
Asian Tour golfers
Asian Games medalists in golf
Danthai Boonma
Golfers at the 2014 Asian Games
Medalists at the 2014 Asian Games
Golfers at the 2014 Summer Youth Olympics
Southeast Asian Games medalists in golf
Danthai Boonma
Competitors at the 2013 Southeast Asian Games
1996 births
Living people
Danthai Boonma